Crimean Trolleybus Line in Crimea is the longest trolleybus line in the world.

Managed by the public transport company Krymtrolleybus, it was built in 1959 in the Ukrainian SSR as an alternative to extending the railway line in Simferopol over the mountains to the coast. It opened in two parts: Simferopol–Alushta in 1959 and Alushta–Yalta in 1961. The journey time to Alushta is about  hours, to Yalta about  hours, and the fare is about ₴15 (since March 2014, ₽58).

It passes through the Crimean Mountains across the Angarskyi Pass, reaching  at the highest point, then descends to the resort town of Alushta on the coast.

Vehicle Fleet

Current

Historical

See also

 List of trolleybus systems in Ukraine
 List of trolleybus systems in Russia

References

External links

 Krym State Production Enterprise "Krymtrolleybus"—official website 
 Excursion by a trolleybus (Simferopol–Yalta)

Transport in Crimea
Transport in the Soviet Union
Trolleybus transport in Ukraine
Simferopol
Yalta
Alushta